Heterocrossa sarcanthes is a moth of the Carposinidae family first described by Edward Meyrick in 1918. It is endemic to New Zealand.

The wingspan is about 15 mm. The head is white, with a few grey specks and the thorax is grey with a curved white median bar. The abdomen is pale pinkish-ochreous. The forewings are elongate, rather narrow, posteriorly somewhat dilated, the costa gently arched, the apex obtuse and the termen straight. They are pale grey, irregularly mixed with white and somewhat sprinkled with dark fuscous. There is a semi-oval blackish blotch on base of the costa and seven dots of blackish irroration on the costa between this and the apex. There are also two small round grey spots edged beneath with blackish and circled with white beneath the costa towards the middle. The hindwings are whitish-grey, but the basal half is suffused with pale pinkish-ochreous.

References

External links
 Holotype specimen of Heterocrossa sarcanthes.

Carposinidae
Moths of New Zealand
Moths described in 1918
Endemic fauna of New Zealand
Taxa named by Edward Meyrick
Endemic moths of New Zealand